A computerized maintenance management system (CMMS), also known as a computerized maintenance management information system (CMMIS), is any software package that maintains a computer database of information about an organization's maintenance operations. This information is intended to help maintenance workers do their jobs more effectively (for example, determining which machines require maintenance and which storerooms contain the spare parts they need) and to help management make informed decisions (for example, calculating the cost of machine breakdown repair versus preventive maintenance for each machine, possibly leading to better allocation of resources).

CMMS data may also be used to verify regulatory compliance. To properly control the maintenance of a facility, information is required to analyze what is occurring. Manually, this requires a tremendous amount of effort and time. A CMMS also allows for record keeping, to track completed and assigned tasks in a timely and cost-effective manner.

See also 
 1:5:200
 Building lifecycle management
 Computer-aided facility management (CAFM)
 Corrective maintenance
 Enterprise asset management (EAM)
 Facility management
 Fixed assets register (FAR)
 Inspection
 Logistics management
 Maintenance, repair and operations
 Performance supervision system
 Predictive maintenance
 Preventive maintenance

References

Further reading 
 

Business software
Information technology management
Management cybernetics
Maintenance